William Marshall Thomas (born December 6, 1941) is an American politician. He was a Republican member of the United States House of Representatives from 1979 to 2007, finishing his tenure representing California's 22nd congressional district and as the Chairman of the House Ways and Means Committee.

Early life and family
Thomas was born in Wallace, Idaho, moving with his parents to the Southern California area. He graduated from Garden Grove High School, attended Santa Ana College, earning an associate's degree before transferring to San Francisco State University, where he earned his bachelor's degree and master's degree in political science in 1963 and 1965, respectively. He became an instructor at Bakersfield College before running for and winning a seat in the California State Assembly in 1974. He won election to the House of Representatives in 1978, representing the 18th congressional district.

Thomas married the former Sharon Lynn Hamilton in 1968. They have two grown children. He and his wife are Baptists.

Career

When Washingtonian magazine polled congressional aides on the "best and worst" of Congress, Thomas was voted #2 for "brainiest", #3 for "workhorse", and #1 for "meanest" and overwhelmingly for "hottest temper" in the House. Thomas is known for being able to comprehend and communicate the intricacies of obscure legislative matters, studying testimony and research reports himself instead of relying on executive summaries from his aides. Thomas is also known for losing his temper when people are unprepared, earning a reputation for sharp interrogations. "He's revered, but he's also reviled to some degree", fellow representative Mark Foley told CQ Weekly.

Thomas was a key proponent of several of President George W. Bush's agenda items, including three major tax cut bills and the Medicare Prescription Drug, Improvement, and Modernization Act of 2003 (PL 108-173), and was also instrumental in the passage of the Balanced Budget Act of 1997.

On March 6, 2006, Thomas announced he would not seek reelection, retiring after 28 years in the House. A major influence on his decision was the internal GOP term limits that would require him to relinquish his Ways and Means chairmanship even if he were re-elected. Thomas endorsed a former aide, Assemblyman Kevin McCarthy, who was elected to replace him. Following McCarthy's vote to decertify the 2020 presidential election, Thomas said that McCarthy was a "hypocrite" and generally lambasted his behavior in regards to that election. Thomas has criticized McCarthy in several interviews since that time.

In 2007, after leaving the House, Thomas joined the American Enterprise Institute as a visiting fellow working on tax policy, trade policy, and health care policy. Thomas also joined law and lobbying firm Buchanan, Ingersoll & Rooney.

On September 8, 2016, Thomas was named to the Kern Community College District Board of Trustees for Area 1, filling the seat of Rick Wright. He did not run for reelection in 2018. He was replaced by Nan Gomez-Heitzeberg.

Congressional committees
U.S. House Committee on Ways and Means – Chairman (2001–2007)

U.S. House Committee on Administration – Chairman (1995–2001)

Controversies

1992: Congressional banking scandal

In the 1992 Rubbergate banking scandal, involving House members writing checks when the funds were not available, Thomas bounced 119 checks, the tenth-highest amount for a Republican member of Congress. A brief overdraft of $16,200, occurred in October 1989, as he wrote a $15,300 check to buy a car.

2001: alleged affair with lobbyist
The Bakersfield Californian published an article on Thomas about an affair with Deborah Steelman, a lobbyist for Cigna, Pfizer, Aetna, United Healthcare Corporation, the Healthcare Leadership Council, and Prudential. Thomas was then chair of the House subcommittee that regulates HMOs. "Any personal failures of commitment or responsibility to my wife, family or friends are just that, personal," the former congressman wrote in an "open letter to friends and neighbors." Neither he nor Steelman explicitly denied the allegations. She was promoted to Vice President of Eli Lilly, a position which she used to steer huge campaign gifts to Thomas's war chest.

The Medicare Modernization Act of 2003 prohibited Medicare from negotiating prescription prices with the drug industry, for instance.

2003: controversy involving U.S. Capitol police 
In July 2003, Thomas called the U.S. Capitol Police to eject Democrats from a meeting room. A few days later, he tearfully apologized on the House floor for what he called his "just plain stupid" decision to ask the police to eject the Congressmen.

Election history

 1974 – Defeated Raymond Gonzales – 54–46%
 1976 – Defeated Stephen W. Schilling – 57–43% 
 1978 – Defeated Bob Sogge – 59–41%
 1980 – Defeated Mary Pat Timmermans – 71–29%
 1982 – Defeated Robert J. Bethea – 68–32%
 1984 – Defeated Michael T. LeSage – 71–29%
 1986 – Defeated Jules H. Moquin – 73–27%
 1988 – Defeated Lita Reid – 71–27%
 1990 – Defeated Michael Thomas – 60–34%
 1992 – Defeated Deborah Vollmer – 65–35%
 1994 – Defeated John Evans – 69–28%
 1996 – Defeated Deborah Vollmer – 66–27%
 1998 – Defeated John Evans – 79–21%
 2000 – Defeated Pete Martinez – 72–25%
 2002 – Defeated Jaime Corvera – 73–24%
 2004 – Unopposed

References

External links

 
 OnTheIssues
 Bill Thomas at nndb.com
 Voting record maintained by the Washington Post
 Voting record maintained by the Vote-Smart.org

|-

1941 births
Living people
People from Wallace, Idaho
Baptists from California
Republican Party members of the California State Assembly
San Francisco State University alumni
American Enterprise Institute
Republican Party members of the United States House of Representatives from California
People from Morro Bay, California
21st-century American politicians
People from Shoshone County, Idaho
Politicians from Bakersfield, California
Baptists from Idaho
Santa Ana College alumni